Fusarium oxysporum f.sp. radicis-lycopersici is a fungal plant pathogen.

Effected hosts
The host range (note that asymptomatic plants can still be hosts) is larger than Fusarium oxysporum lycopersici and includes :

References

External links
 USDA ARS Fungal Database

oxysporum f.sp. radicis-lycopersici
Fungal plant pathogens and diseases
Forma specialis taxa